Nick Corr is co-founder, with Mick Thomas of Australia's Croxton Records. Founded in 1999, the label provides a home for a select group of  acts, with the house ethos a mixture of country and roots, folk and rock. 

Croxton's first release was a compilation album, All the Labour, from Austin based alternative country band, The Gourds, followed by Wanderin’ Mind by The Dunaways, and releases by James Stewart, Nick Barker, The Prayerbabies, The Drowners, Git, The Re-Mains, Marcel Borrack, Dan Warner, Sarah Carroll, The Underminers and Young Modern plus Mick Thomas and The Sure Thing and various live recordings, theatre, film and online projects like The Tank and Dust On My Shoes.

Nick was also a sometime DJ for Melbourne independent radio station 3RRR - mostly hosting the alternative-country Twang programme, and filling in for then program manager James Young on his drive-time programme.

Nick was also involved in some online music journalism, acting as Australian correspondent for US Addicted to Noise and Allmusic. He was also heavily involved with assisting Brian Wise with the launch and initially running of an Australian version of Addicted To Noise.

In 2005 Nick appeared as a contestant on the SBS music trivia program RocKwiz and dominated the episode.

He has three children his favourite being Milo, his oldest

References

External links
 Croxton Records WebSite
 Interview and bio of Corr

Living people
Year of birth missing (living people)
Australian businesspeople
Australian music journalists